Lycorea ilione, the clearwing mimic queen is a species of nymphalid butterfly in the subfamily Danainae. The species was first described by Pieter Cramer in 1775.

Subspecies
Subspecies include:
 Lycorea ilione ilione; present in Brazil
 Lycorea ilione albescens (Distant, 1876); present in Central America
 Lycorea ilione decolorata (Haensch, 1909); present in Ecuador
 Lycorea ilione lamira (Latreille, [1817]); present in Colombia
 Lycorea ilione phenarete (Doubleday, 1847); present in Bolivia and Peru

Distribution and habitat
This species is present in Mexico, Guatemala, Colombia, Ecuador, Brazil, Bolivia and Peru.

Description

It is an extremely variable species. These large and strongly marked butterflies show yellow-tipped antennae and black thorax with white dots and gray abdomen. All wings are rounded, with forewings much longer than the hindwings and with concave inner edge. The wings are transparent, bordered with black, with black veins and dark bands dividing the wings into several areas. Some subspecies are brown with brown basal part of the forewings.

Biology
The larvae mainly feed on Ficus species (F. benjamina, F. carica and F. pumila), but also on Jacaratia hasslerina, Carica papaya and Myoporum lactum. Males feed on Senecio, Eupatorium and Neomiranda flowers from which they obtain alkaloids used for chemical defense, as these toxins cause nausea in birds that prey them.

References

External links
 "Inventory of the butterfly species of Sangay National Park - Ecuador".
"Species Lycorea ilione". Butterflies of America.

Danaini
Nymphalidae of South America
Butterflies described in 1775
Taxa named by Pieter Cramer